California Republic is the thirteenth  mixtape by rapper the Game hosted by DJ Skee. The mixtape was released April 5, 2012 in anticipation of Game's upcoming fifth album, and follows the highly successful mixtape Purp and Patron in 2011.

Background
The mixtape features guest appearances by Fat Joe, Rick Ross, Busta Rhymes, DJ Khaled, Ace Hood, Meek Mill, 2 Chainz, French Montana, Slim Thug, Fabolous, Trey Songz, Snoop Dogg, Lupe Fiasco, Pharrell, Shyne, Nipsey Hussle, Teyana Taylor, Young Chris, Ben J, Mysonne, Lyfe Jennings, Drake, Lil Wayne, Mele, Lifestyle, Nobody, Eric Bellinger, Sam Hook, Kid Red, Kobe, Cyssero and Denise Janae. The mixtape contains a number of songs that were originally scheduled to appear on The R.E.D. Album. These include "Bottles and Rockin' J's", "Skate On", "When My Niggas Come Home" and "Roll My Shit".

Production came from Cool and Dre, Infamous, StreetRunner, Trey Songz, the Neptunes, Lex Luger, Boi-1da, the Beat Bully, Young Yonny, Mars, Tre Beatz, Sam Kalandjian, King David, Orlando and Tsass.

Track listing

References

2012 compilation albums
The Game (rapper) albums
Albums produced by Sap (producer)
Albums produced by Boi-1da
Albums produced by Cool & Dre
Albums produced by Just Blaze
Albums produced by Lex Luger
Albums produced by the Neptunes
2012 mixtape albums
Gangsta rap compilation albums
Albums produced by Mars (record producer)